Gol de Quem? is the second studio album of the Brazilian rock band Pato Fu. It was released in 1995 and it had sold about 50,000 copies. From Minas Gerais, they have a pop/rock style strongly influenced by Os Mutantes. They perform mostly originals fusing different rhythms over a foundation of humor. Redneck music, rock ("Vida Imbecil" is shamelessly based on "2001" by Tom Zé/Rita Lee, recorded as a redneck rock in 1969 album Mutantes by Os Mutantes), pop (the hit "Sobre o Tempo"), seresta (the electronic rendition for the old seresta classic "A Volta do Boêmio"), and Beatlemania ("Qualquer Bobagem" has references to Sgt. Pepper's Lonely Hearts Club Band, "Ob-La-Di, Ob-La-Da" is delivered in a tempo three times faster than in the original version, "Mamãe Ama É o Meu Revólver" references Revolver), everything in a package replete with drum machines and other heavy electronics.

"Vida de Operário" is a cover of the Brazilian punk band Excomungados.

Track listing

Personnel 
 Fernanda Takai -  lead vocals, acoustic guitar, arrangements
 John Ulhoa - lead guitar, vocals; programming (Roland MC50), acoustic guitar
 Ricardo Koctus - bass guitar, vocals

Guest musicians 
 Demétrio Bezerra - trumpet
 Eduardo Lyra - percussion
 José Milton - vocals
 João Lira - acoustic guitar
 Xadia Polidro - talking

References

Pato Fu albums
1994 albums